Vurgun Huseynov (born 25 April 1988) is an Azerbaijani professional footballer who plays as a defender for Sumgayit.

Career
In the summer of 2013, Huseynov left Gabala and signed for Sumgayit.

Career statistics

References

External links 

1988 births
Living people
Azerbaijani footballers
Azerbaijan international footballers
Association football midfielders
Turan-Tovuz IK players
Gabala FC players
Sumgayit FK players
Azerbaijan Premier League players